Kulfa gosht is a popular dish among Hyderabadi Muslims, originating in Hyderabad, India. Kulfa is an Urdu word for purslane, a succulent green leafy vegetable; gosht is a South Asian term for "meat". The combination of purslane with lamb is a unique fusion by Hyderabadi Muslims.

References

Hyderabadi cuisine
Telangana cuisine
Indian meat dishes
Pakistani meat dishes